It's Time! is an album recorded by a group led by American saxophonist Jackie McLean recorded in 1964 and released on the Blue Note label. It features McLean in a quintet with trumpeter Charles Tolliver, pianist Herbie Hancock, bassist Cecil McBee and drummer Roy Haynes.

Reception
The AllMusic review by Thom Jurek awarded the album 3½ stars.

Track listing
All compositions by Jackie McLean except as noted
 "Cancellation" (Charles Tolliver) - 7:45
 "Das' Dat" - 6:26
 "It's Time" - 6:35
 "Revillot" (Tolliver) - 7:51
 "'Snuff" - 7:47
 "Truth" (Tolliver) - 6:30

Personnel
Jackie McLean - alto saxophone
Charles Tolliver - trumpet
Herbie Hancock - piano
Cecil McBee - bass
Roy Haynes - drums

References

Blue Note Records albums
Jackie McLean albums
1965 albums
Albums recorded at Van Gelder Studio
Albums produced by Alfred Lion